Sangiano is a comune (municipality) in the Province of Varese in the Italian region Lombardy, located about  northwest of Milan and about  northwest of Varese.

Sangiano borders the following municipalities: Besozzo, Caravate, Laveno-Mombello, Leggiuno.
In the area of Sangiano there's a limestone rock wall called "falesia del Picuz" prepared for sport climbing with fixed bolts and belays.

Demographic evolution

References

Cities and towns in Lombardy